The Barca Bridge is a bridge over the Lérez River, at its mouth in the Pontevedra Ria, which connects the city of Pontevedra (in the area of A Moureira) with the municipality of Poio in Spain.

History 
According to documents from 1197, the boat passage, which gave its name to the place and the bridge, was controlled by the Benedictine monks of the monastery of St John of Poio.

In the 19th century, the Society of Seamen of Pontevedra exploited the passage, which led to clashes with the monastery of Poio, the Marquis of Riestra and the Spanish Navy. To avoid these confrontations, given the need to build a bridge, the "Barca bridge building society" was created, formed by the Seafarers' Society, the inhabitants of Poio and capitalist partners.

First bridge 
The first low wooden bridge at La Barca was built in 1867 and began operating in 1871. The structure included a lifting section, which was lifted with a winch to allow the passage of large ships to the Galera and Burgo quays.

Second bridge 

The administrations, especially the Marquis of Riestra, who had a rural estate and a factory in A Caeira, and politicians such as Eduardo Vincenti or Eugenio Montero Ríos, demanded the construction of a raised bridge and another parallel one for the passage of the railway. In 1887, work began on what was to be a stone bridge. Work was halted for seven years.

In 1894, the construction of a metal bridge became necessary, as it is in contemporary architecture, because of the greater ease of transport, which allowed for more ductile handling and faster execution of the bridge. The work brings together the postulates of metal architecture, which has been using steel as an architectural material since Joseph Paxton built the Crystal Palace pavilion at the London World's Exhibition in 1851.

The project, designed by Luis Acosta and Eduardo Fungueiriño, was carried out by Chavarri, Petrement and Co. During its construction, the workers hired by the industrialist Benito Corbal went on strike for some time, which ended thanks to the mediation of the civil governor, Augusto González Besada.

At the beginning of the 20th century, work began on the central metal arch. The bridge was inaugurated on 3 July 1905. It had an arch with a span of 75 metres, resting on two solid masonry supports, and three arches on each side, in which ornamental motifs in the Gothic style, in the taste of the time, were carved. On the eve of the inauguration, load tests were carried out, putting 200 tonnes under static load and 13 carriages of 4 tonnes each under dynamic load.

The bridge became a dividing line in the area of A Moureira, leaving on one side the residential area of the sailors, on the other the area of taverns and brothels.

Renovations 
In 1945, work began to replace the metal structure with a concrete arch of 72 metres span designed by Eduardo Torroja Miret. However, the work was not completed until 1950.

In 1989, the masonry abutment on the south side was modified from three arches to a wider one, below which is Corbaceiras Avenue. Two years later, the twin abutment on the north side was also widened to accommodate the AP-9 below.

Nowadays, after renovation work in the mid-1990s and 2010s, the bridge has two-way traffic for vehicles and covered pavements for pedestrians.

Description 
The bridge owes its name to the fact that in the past, the passage from Pontevedra to Poio was made by boat.

The current bridge is formed by a large reinforced concrete arch with a 72-metre span over the Ria de Pontevedra and two smaller low masonry arches with a 25-metre span on the landward sides. It is decorated with bas-reliefs at the bottom of the large concrete support pillars covered in granite.

The bridge is 13 metres wide and 200 metres long. The span of the arch supports two lanes of road traffic and two pavements.

To protect the passers-by from the winter winds and rains, there is a wooden awning over the pavements of the bridge.

Gallery

References

See also

Related articles 
 Burgo Bridge
 Tirantes Bridge
 Currents Bridge
 Santiago Bridge
 List of bridges in Spain

External links 
 A Barca Bridge on the website Structurae
 La Barca Bridge

Bridges over the Lérez River
Bridges completed in the 19th century
Road bridges in Spain
Buildings and structures in Pontevedra
Buildings and structures in the Province of Pontevedra
Bridges completed in 1905
Bridges in Galicia (Spain)
Transport in Galicia (Spain)
Arch bridges
Bridges in Pontevedra